Bracorina is a settlement in Lochaber, in the Highland council area of Scotland. It is located on the northern side of Loch Morar, 5 km east of the village of Morar, at the end of a minor road. A footpath continues alongside the loch, to the remote hamlet of Tarbet.

Populated places in Lochaber